Pellegrini–Stieda syndrome (also called Stieda disease and Köhler–Pellegrini–Stieda disease) refers to the ossification of the superior part of the medial collateral ligament of the knee. It is a common incidental finding on knee radiographs.  It is named for the Italian surgeon A. Pellegrini (b. 1877) and the German surgeon A. Stieda (1869–1945).

References

Further reading

External links
  Whonamedit.com

Syndromes with musculoskeletal abnormalities